Wayne Leslie Blair (11 May 1948 – 11 January 2019) was a New Zealand cricketer who played first-class cricket for Otago from 1967 to 1991.

Early life 
Blair made his first-class debut for Otago in 1967–68 as an opening batsman. He played all that season and all the next, reaching 50 only once, when he scored 83 in the last match of the 1968–69 season. He moved down the order in 1969–70, keeping wicket in one match and winning selection in a New Zealand Under-23 team against the touring Australians, when he top-scored in the second innings with 40. He returned to the opening position and produced a number of useful but not large scores up to the end of the 1973–74 season.

After a time out of first-class cricket he returned to the Otago team in 1977–78 and maintained his place. He made his first century in the match against Canterbury in 1980–81, batting at number four. After Canterbury declared at 409 for 5, Otago were dismissed for 224 (Blair top-scoring with 88) and, following on, 266 (Blair again top-scoring with 140). His other century came the following season, when he scored 132 out of a total of 274 against Wellington.

He left first-class cricket after the 1982–83 season, but was recalled in 1990–91 at the age of 42 as a middle-order batsman. He reached a score of at least 40 in each of the first three matches, but finished with 165 runs at an average of 18.33 in five matches. That was his last season in first-class cricket.

In domestic List A cricket he won the man of the match award when he scored 102 against Wellington in 1979–80.

Blair died in Dunedin on 11 January 2019.

His younger brother, Bruce, played One Day Internationals for New Zealand in the 1980s.

References

1948 births
2019 deaths
Cricketers from Dunedin
New Zealand cricketers
Otago cricketers